Isuto is an administrative ward in the Mbeya Rural district of the Mbeya Region of Tanzania. In 2016 the Tanzania National Bureau of Statistics report there were 15,383 people in the ward, from 13,958 in 2012.

Villages and hamlets 
The ward has 8 villages, and 75 hamlets.

 Mlowo
 Ihanda
 Inganzo
 Mbuga
 Mlowo A
 Mlowo B
 Mlowo C
 Nyondo
 Samora
 Tozi A
 Tozi B
 Itete
 Chombezi
 Igagala
 Itete A
 Itete B
 Itete C
 Mwanjelwa A
 Mwanjelwa B
 Mwanjelwa C
 Nsonga
 Shinzingo
 Iwaga
 Iwalanje
 Masoko
 Mjele
 Mkuyuni
 Mlima Nyundu
 Mwendo
 Ngala
 Nsalala
 Shelela
 Idiwili
 Azimio
 Idiwili A
 Idiwili B
 Itaga
 Lutengano
 Mtakuja
 Shilungu A
 Shilungu B
 Shisonta
 Ileya
 Ileya kati
 Kaloleni
 Matipu
 Mkuyuni
 Muungano
 Mwanjelwa
 Shisonta A
 Shisonta B
 Shisonta C
 Isuto
 Igosya
 Ihenga A
 Ihenga B
 Ilizya
 Isuto A
 Isuto B
 Lywayo
 Mapinduzi A
 Mapinduzi B
 Mporoto
 Mtakuja
 Njiapanda
 Shitete
 Halungu
 Ilanga
 Shitete A
 Shitete B
 Yona A
 Yona B
 Yona C
 Ilindi
 Honde
 Igunda
 Ilindi A
 Ilindi B
 Mkuyuni
 Mlingotini
 Sanyesya
 Shilungu
 Sogea Ilala

References 

Wards of Mbeya Region